The New York Institute of Technology School of Management (also known as NYITSOM) is the business school of the New York Institute of Technology. The NYIT School of Management offers graduate degrees, including Master of Business Administration degree (M.B.A.) and Master of Science degree in Risk Management (M.S.R.M.) among others. The school also offers many undergraduate degrees, including in business administration, management, finance, and marketing at its campuses in United States, Canada, and China. The School of Management also collaborates with multiple colleges and universities worldwide, offering joint programs, dual degrees, summer study programs, study abroad options, and faculty and student exchange. The school of management is led by Deborah Y. Cohn, Ph.D., MBA (89) as interim dean. All domestic and global campuses of New York Institute of Technology School of Management are accredited by Association to Advance Collegiate Schools of Business (AACSB) In 2015, NYIT's MBA program was ranked #1 in the United States in terms of salary-to-debt ratio. According to the survey by SoFi, graduates of NYIT's MBA program make an average of $126,068 per year, and have an average debt of $50,308.

History
That year, NYIT also launched its first master's program, a Master of Business Administration. In February 2015, NYIT's School of Management academic programs at all campuses received accreditation from the AACSB (Association to Advance Collegiate Schools of Business).

Campus

NYIT's School of Management is located on two of NYIT's New York campuses, in Old Westbury and Manhattan. NYIT's School of Management is also located in Canada (Vancouver), China (Nanchang), China (Nanjing), China (Shanghai) and China (Beijing).

Academics
In February 2015, NYIT's School of Management academic programs at all campuses received accreditation from the AACSB (Association to Advance Collegiate Schools of Business). NYIT is accredited by the Commission on Higher Education of the Middle States Association of Colleges and Schools (all campuses). As well, currently the School of Management academic programs are licensed and/or accredited by the following agencies worldwide:

Canada (Vancouver): The Master of Business Administration academic degree program is accredited by the Degree Quality Assessment Board of the Ministry of Advanced Education and is authorized for delivery under the Degree Authorization Act.
China (Nanchang): The School of Management, by way of its partnership with Jiangxi University of Finance and Economics, is authorized to and licensed to deliver its Joint Master of Business Administration academic degree program, plus Certificate, by the Education Department of the People's Government of Jiangxi Province.
China (Nanjing): The School of Management, by way of its affiliation with Nanjing University of Post and Telecommunication, is licensed and accredited by the Jiangsu Province Education Department to deliver the Bachelor of Science academic degree program.
China (Shanghai): The School of Management, by way of its affiliation with Tongji University, is licensed and accredited by the Shanghai Municipal Education Commission to deliver the Dual-Master of Business Administration and Master of Science in Human Resource Management and Labor Relations academic degree programs.
China (Beijing): The School of Management, by way of its affiliation with Tsinghua University, is licensed to deliver the Executive Master of Business Administration academic degree program by the Ministry of Education of the People's Republic of China.

New York Institute of Technology is chartered by the board of regents of the University of the State of New York.

The NYIT School of Management offers graduate degrees, including Master of Business Administration degree (M.B.A.) and Master of Science degree in Risk Management (M.S.R.M), among others. The school also offers many undergraduate degrees, including in business administration, finance, management, and marketing at its overseas campuses in United States, Canada, and China. The School of Management also collaborates with multiple colleges and universities worldwide, offering joint programs, dual degrees, summer study programs, study abroad options, and faculty and student exchange. The NYIT SOM emphasis is on the combination of business and technology to solve complex problems involving decision making and resource allocation. The Master of Business Administration degree, a general management version, and specialized concentrations in business analytics, finance, marketing, operations and supply chain management offers candidates the opportunity to prepare themselves in a wide variety of areas for administrative posts in the business world. The School of Management Faculty is as varied as the global mosaic of world regions in which contemporary business operates. They teach global business strategies and techniques based on their intimate knowledge of cultures, social dynamics and infrastructures. All of the core faculty holds doctoral degrees from top American and overseas universities. The NYIT SoM does not use teaching assistants, graders, preceptors, etc. in either traditional or virtual classrooms. Students interact directly with faculty, in matters concerning course material, term projects, exams, academic advising and professional development.

Combined B.S.B.A and M.B.A. program in 5 years 
For qualified undergraduate students, the School of Management, offers a combined Bachelor of Science and Master of Business Administration degree program that will permit successful candidates to earn both degrees in five years of full-time attendance. The M.B.A. portion of the program can also be completed through part-time evening and Saturday studies while the candidate is employed.

Combined B.S. in architectural technology and M.B.A. program

For qualified upper-class undergraduate students in the Architectural Technology program, the School of Management, in conjunction with the School of Architecture and Fine Arts, offers a combined Bachelor of Science and Master of Business Administration degree program that will permit successful candidates to earn both degrees in five years of full-time attendance. The M.B.A. portion of the program can also be completed through part-time evening and Saturday studies while the candidate is employed.

The Corporate M.B.A. Program

As part of its commitment to service the business community, the School of Management may make available selected M.B.A. courses on-site for the benefit and convenience of corporate employers and will design specific industry related courses that can be offered as M.B.A. electives in the degree program. Similar programs have been conducted for the employees of a major airline, the Department of Defense at two military locations and for employees of a major
corporation in New York State. The Corporate M.B.A. Program offers a unique synergism of theory and practice and it stresses involvement of the sponsoring organization in design and evaluation of course materials and teaching performance.

NYIT offers executive M.B.A. (E.M.B.A.) programs to senior Chinese business managers in partnership with Tsinghua University, Jinan University, Renmin University of China, and Xiamen University. The students, after a successful completion of the program, will receive an E.M.B.A. degree from NYIT, in addition to a Business Administration Certificate from the NYIT's partner Institute through which the student come to attend the NYIT program.

Facilities
New York Institute of Technology School of Management has state-of-the-art trading rooms, as well as several on‑campus business incubators.

Research centers
Research centers at New York Institute of Technology School of Management include:

Entrepreneurial Studies
Hospitality Management
Human Resource Studies
International Business Studies
Risk Management

Podcast - In Reality: Lessons from Leaders and Entrepreneurs 
The School of Management podcast hosted by John Rebecchi (M.BA. ’83), Ph.D., interviews guests with varied backgrounds and experience. In each episode, the guests offer unique perspectives on problem solving, decision making, and how to confront the challenges of starting and running a business. By listening to the podcast, you can learn from the experiences of others, as well as gain insight into the business world.

https://www.nyit.edu/management/in_reality_lessons_from_leaders_and_entrepreneurs

Admissions
Admission to the NYIT School of Management is selective. Admissions decisions are made on a holistic basis that considers academic record, standardized test scores, accomplishments outside of the classroom, recommendations, and essays. For graduate admission, a baccalaureate degree from an accredited college with a minimum 3.0/4.0 GPA is required Acceptance rate is 65% to the graduate programs, as of 2015.

Student life
NYIT School of Management has over 50 active student clubs. NYIT School of Management also organizes many business conferences each year.

Notable alumni

 Daisy Exposito-Ulla, former CEO, The Bravo Group Young & Rubicam
 Perry J. Kaufman, trader, index developer and financial theorist
 Monte N. Redman, president and chief executive officer and a member of the board of directors of Astoria Financial Corporation and its subsidiary Astoria Bank
John Antioco, CEO, Blockbuster Video, chairman, board of directors, Red Mango
Ben Wolo, CEO, LIBTELCO
Eli Wachtel, managing director, Bear Stearns
Robert E. Evanson, president, McGraw-Hill Education
James Chip Cleary, president and principal head of the International Association of Amusement Parks and Attractions
Lori Bizzoco, writer, journalist, former public relations executive and is currently the founder and executive editor of CupidsPulse.com, a relationship advice and entertainment news website
Richard J. Daly, CEO, Broadridge Financial Solutions
Chen Ningning, self-made billionaire
Joji, singer, songwriter, rapper, record producer, author, and former Internet personality and comedian.

References

External links 
Google+
Facebook
Twitter 
TheBizDen
Twitter
Facebook

Business schools in New York (state)
Educational institutions established in 1955
New York Institute of Technology
Universities and colleges in Manhattan
1955 establishments in New York City